Ogdens Cave Natural Area Preserve is a  Natural Area Preserve located in Frederick County, Virginia. The preserve protects a cave that carries a below-ground branch of Buffalo Marsh Run, which also flows overland through the preserve.

Several rare invertebrate species are found within the cave, including the thin-neck cave beetle (Pseudanophthalmus parvicollis), two amphipods, an isopod, and the Appalachian springsnail (Fontigens bottimeri). These species are sustained by nutrients delivered by the cave's stream and by various animals, such as bats and crickets, that come and go from time to time.

Above ground, the preserve covers a former farm that is reverting to a natural state. Management of the preserve includes the planting of native warm-season grasses in upland fields, and hardwood trees along Buffalo Marsh Run, to reconstruct the historic natural landscape of the area.

The preserve is owned and maintained by the Virginia Department of Conservation and Recreation. To protect the cave's delicate ecosystem, public access is not permitted. Public, guided tours of the cave have been arranged in the past.

See also
 List of Virginia Natural Area Preserves

References

External links
Virginia Department of Conservation and Recreation: Ogdens Cave Natural Area Preserve

Virginia Natural Area Preserves
Protected areas of Frederick County, Virginia
Landforms of Frederick County, Virginia
Caves of Virginia